The 1907–08 season was Galatasaray SK's 4th in existence and the club's 2nd consecutive season in the Istanbul Football League.
Ali Sami Yen broke his leg during the Moda FC match and then he announced his retirement from football.

Squad statistics

Istanbul Football League

Classification

Matches
Kick-off listed in local time (EEST)

Cadi-Keuy FC-Galatasaray SK:11-0 (1907)
Cadi-Keuy FC-Galatasaray SK:7-0 (1907)
Cadi-Keuy FC-Galatasaray SK:0-0 (1907)
Moda FC-Galatasaray SK:1-4

References
 1907-1908 İstanbul Futbol Ligi. Türk Futbol Tarihi vol.1. page(30). (June 1992) Türkiye Futbol Federasyonu Yayınları.

External links
 Galatasaray Sports Club Official Website 
 Turkish Football Federation - Galatasaray A.Ş. 
 uefa.com - Galatasaray AŞ

Galatasaray S.K. (football) seasons
Turkish football clubs 1907–08 season
1900s in Istanbul